Somerset Trust Holding Company, doing business as Somerset Trust Company, is an American bank and financial services company headquartered in Somerset, Pennsylvania.  As of December 31, 2016, the bank's assets are totaled at $1.1 billion. Somerset Trust Company's branch network serves Pennsylvania counties of Somerset, Westmoreland, Cambria, Bedford, and Fayette County, with a branch in Garrett County, Maryland. Somerset Trust Company elected to deny government TARP (Trouble Asset Relief Program) money in 2008.

History

In 1889, congressman Edward Scull and his son George R. Scull created The First National Bank of Somerset. Edward Scull remained president and chairman of the board until his death in 1900. His son took over the role and in 1900 he directed a group that founded a new institution, in addition to The First National Bank of Somerset, called Somerset Trust Company.

On December 20, 1900, Governor William A. Stone issued a letter, incorporating Somerset Trust Company as a Pennsylvania chartered bank. A group of six businessmen led by George R. Scull incorporated the bank. Somerset Trust Company's creation as a state-chartered bank in Pennsylvania allowed them to provide bonding activities and financial services The First National Bank of Somerset was unable to perform.

George R. Scull remained director and president of both The First National Bank of Somerset and Somerset Trust Company until his death in 1935. John I. Scull, the son of George R. Scull, continued down the family line and served as president of both banks after his father's death. John I. Scull served two terms as president of Somerset Trust Company and The National Bank of Somerset, from 1935 to 1938, and again from 1949 to 1953. Ernest V. Cook, former artillery major of World War I, served as president of the First National Bank of Somerset from 1938 to 1949.

New regulations erased most of the differences between the powers of federal and state chartered banks and in 1953, The First National Bank of Somerset and Somerset Trust Company were merged under Somerset Trust's charter to achieve the economies of scale inherent in the operation of one bank as opposed to two. At that time, combined assets of the banks totaled approximately $8 million. John I. Scull retired in 1954 and George Scull Cook became the chief executive officer of Somerset Trust Company. For thirty-four years, George Scull Cook led the bank, and during his time as CEO, assets at the bank grew to $145 million.

During the 1970s, the bank acquired property on West Main Street in Somerset, and moved its headquarters. The property located at 151 West Main Street once held the print shop of Frederick Goeb. The first Bible printed west of the Allegheny Mountains was printed at the site of Somerset's current headquarters. Today, Sean Cook currently serves as CEO of Somerset Trust Company.

Community Initiatives

Flight 93 National Memorial contributions
Somerset Trust Company played a role in post-United Airlines Flight 93 recovery efforts in Somerset County as a result of the September 11 attacks in 2001. Somerset Trust's former CEO, G. Henry Cook, served on the 15-member jury designated to choose the design of the Flight 93 National Memorial. The bank contributed more than US$50,000 to the memorial project and assisted in underwriting consulting services. The United States Navy commissioned the USS Somerset in honor of Flight 93 passengers, Somerset Trust made significant financial contributions to match funds for the commissioning ceremony held in Philadelphia.

Connellsville Union Passenger Depot
In 2014, Somerset Trust Company bought the P&LE Train Station in Connellsville. Somerset Trust purchased the buildings at the station site along West Crawford Avenue with plans to restore the original station; a site listed on the National Historic Register.  Officials of Somerset Trust and the Fayette County Cultural Trust joint-hosted a meeting for the general public interested in the development of the train station. The  grand opening was held for the branch at the newly restored building on October 25, 2014.

Mobile banking efforts
Somerset Trust Company has striven to be a leader in technology in the community banking industry. At roughly $1.6 billion in assets, the bank has a mobile app that allows customers to log in with a fingerprint instead of a password, turn on and off their debit cards using the app and pay their bills with their smartphone camera. The bank has also made it possible for new customers to open an account using the mobile app, instead of signing up through online banking or walking into a branch.

Mobile account opening is so new, it's hard to find statistics on it. Almost all the banks that allow it are larger than $50 billion in assets. But it's increasingly talked about as an avenue to generate new customers and accounts in an age when consumers increasingly rely on their smartphones for everything.

“Most community institutions do not really have a good strategy for account opening on the phone,’’ says Jim Burson, senior director at Cornerstone Advisors, a consulting firm in Scottsdale, Arizona. “Most people have the basic functional [items such as], ‘I can make a payment, I can check my account balance.’ But the big gap that needs to be closed is the account origination and loan origination piece of mobile.”

Gill says the bank simplified a lot of its own front-end and back-end processes to make it happen, so the app, for example, will scan identification such as a driver’s license, process the identification verification and order debit cards automatically. The bank also sends disclosures electronically. The same account opening system will work online as on the mobile app. “We’re trying to make this device independent,’’ he says. “Our branches say it is so time consuming to open an account. It really makes the customer experience better.”

Somerset is using Bolts Technologies to launch the new account opening platform. It already uses Malauzai Software for its mobile platform and Fiserv as its core processor. Gill and Cook declined to provide estimates of the costs and savings associated with mobile account opening. But being a privately owned bank certainly helped justify the investment, Cook says. “An awful lot of traditional businesses [are] very afraid of taking the incremental risk because some Wall Street types are going to be on their backs: ‘What about this quarter?’ The job of the CEO is to maximize shareholder wealth over time, and somehow that has been lost.”

Only about 10.6 percent of all the banks and credit unions in the country had fingerprint authentication as of March, 2016, according to an estimate in Mobile Banking Quantified, a report by research firm Celent and FI Navigator. Fewer than 1 percent had photo bill pay and 4.1 percent had debit card on/off switches in the app.

Why does Somerset Trust Company, a community bank, want to be in the league of only a few banks offering such services? In the late 90s, the bank was struggling to grow and had only about $200 million in assets. It surveyed about 10,000 people, who said they wanted to do business with a community bank, but perceived that community banks just can’t “keep up.” Cook decided that the bank, in fact, would need to keep up. “Why do people not deal with local banks? They don’t think they’re experts. What does an expert mean in this day and age? We think technology is part of that answer.”

References

External links
https://www.somersettrust.com/ — Official website

1889 establishments in Pennsylvania
Banks based in Pennsylvania
Holding companies of the United States
Holding companies established in 1889
American companies established in 1889
Banks established in 1889